The State Council of Kandy was a crucial governmental body in the Kingdom of Kandy of Sri Lanka. It was established by Senasammata Vikramabahu of Kandy, shortly after he declared the Kingdom of Kandy as an independent state in 1469. The council was led by three officials, known as the Adigars, who was appointed by the King. The Adigars held a position similar to that of a Prime Minister and were entrusted to deliberate over critical issues of the state, providing valuable advice to the King.

Initially, there was only one Adigar, but during the reign of Rajasinghe II, he appointed two Adigars, and later, Sri Vikrama Rajasinha of Kandy appointed three Adigars to the council. The State Council of Kandy was responsible for advising the King on important matters concerning the state, including matters of defense, foreign affairs, and governance. Their duties also included overseeing the administration of justice and the collection of taxes.

After the Kandyan Convention, which took place on March 2, 1815, and is known for its controversial nature, the authority of the State Council was diminished as it transferred power to the British Empire.

Structure
The king was the absolute authority. Ministers could advise only. The Kandyan state council compromised:
 the Adigars (අදිකාරම් මහත්මයා)
Pallegampaha adikaram mahatmeya (පල්ලෙගම්පහ අදිකාරම් මහත්මයා)
Udegampaha adikaram mahatmeya (උඩගම්පහ අදිකාරම් මහත්මයා)
Siyapattuwe adikaram mahatmeya (සියපත්තුවේ අදිකාරම් මහත්මයා)
 the Disawes (මහ දිසාව මහත්මයා)
Hathare-korlé maha-dissava mahatmeya.
Sath-korlé maha-dissava mahatmeya.
Uva maha-dissava mahatmeya.
Matalé maha-dissava mahatmeya.
Sabaragamuwa dissava mahatmeya.
Thun Korale dissava mahatmeya.
Nuwarakalavia dissava mahatmeya.
Tamankaduwa dissava mahatmeya.
Wellassé dissava mahatmeya.
Bintenne dissava mahatmeya.
Walapane dissava mahatmeya.
Udapalata dissava mahatmeya.
 the Rate Mahatmayas (රටේ මහත්මයා)
Udunuwara rate-mahatmeya.
Yatinuwara rate-mahatmeya.
Tumpane rate-mahatmeya.
Haris Pattuwe rate-mahatmeya.
Dumbara rate-mahatmeya.
Hewahetta rate-mahatmeya.
Kothmale rate-mahatmeya.

Sources

References

See also

 
Kingdoms of Sri Lanka
Former countries in South Asia
Former monarchies of South Asia
1815 disestablishments in Ceylon
History of Kandy
1469 establishments in Asia
15th-century establishments in Sri Lanka
States and territories established in the 1460s